The Shakey's V-League 12th Season Reinforced Open Conference was the 24th conference of the Shakey's V-League that started on October 10, 2015 at the Filoil Flying V Arena, San Juan.

Tournament Format

Preliminaries (PL)
Teams will play a single round robin format.
 The TOP 4 TEAMS will advance to the semi-finals (SF) round.
 The bottom two (2) teams will be eliminated from the tournament.

Semi-finals (SF)
The top four teams at the end of the single-round eliminations will advance to semifinals, with the top two earning a twice-to-beat advantage.
 Semi-finals series: Rank 1 vs Rank 4 and Rank 2 vs Rank 3
 Top two (2) SF teams will compete for GOLD.
 Bottom two (2) SF teams will compete for BRONZE.

Finals
The battle for GOLD and the battle for BRONZE will both follow the best-of-three format, provided:
 If the battle for GOLD ends in two (2) matches (2-0), then there will no longer be a Game 3 for either GOLD or Bronze. A tie in BRONZE (1-1) will be resolve using FIVB rules.
 A tie in the series for GOLD (1-1) after Game 2 will be broken in a Game 3, regardless of the result of the series in BRONZE.

Participating Teams

Conference Line-up

Preliminary round

|}

Match Results

|}

Semifinals Round
 Ranking is based from the preliminary round.

Rank 1 vs Rank 4
* Philippine Army Lady Troopers (Rank #1) had the twice-to-beat advantage

|}

Rank 2 vs Rank 3
* PLDT Home Ultera (Rank #2) had the twice-to-beat advantage

|}

Finals

Battle for Bronze

Battle for Gold

Final standings

 Note: 
 (c) – Team Captain
 (L) – Libero

Awards

Most Valuable Player (Finals)
 Alyssa Valdez ( PLDT)
Most Valuable Player (Conference)
 Jovelyn Gonzaga ( Army)
Best Setter
 Janet Serafica ( Navy)
Best  Outside Spikers
 Honey Royse Tubino ( Army)
 Janine Marciano ( PLDT)

Best Middle Blockers
 Kathy Bersola ( UP)
 Sheena Mae Chopitea ( UP)
Best Opposite Spiker
 Jovelyn Gonzaga ( Army)
Best Libero
 Lizlee Ann Gata-Pantone ( PLDT)

External links
 www.v-league.ph - Official website

See also
 Spikers' Turf 1st Season Reinforced Open Conference
 Shakey's V-League conference results

References

Shakey's V-League conferences
2015 in Philippine sport